The Carriage of Goods by Road Act 1965 (c. 37) is an Act of Parliament made by the Parliament of the United Kingdom in order to implement the Convention on the Contract for the International Carriage of Goods by Road of 1956 into British law. The act is often relied upon in cross-border litigation to give jurisdiction to the Courts of the United Kingdom in disputes related to road haulage.

References
 Koji Takahashi.  Claims for Contribution and Reimbursement in an International Context.  Oxford University Press,  2000.

External links

1965 in law
United Kingdom Acts of Parliament 1965
1965 in transport
Road transport in the United Kingdom